Pointe au Baril Station Water Aerodrome  is located  southwest of Pointe au Baril, Ontario Canada.

References

Registered aerodromes in Ontario
Registered aerodromes in Parry Sound District
Seaplane bases in Ontario